Gitsegukla (also Kitsegeucla or Skeena Crossing) is a Gitxsan community of about 500 at the confluence of the Kitseguecla and Skeena Rivers, approximately 40 km southwest of Hazelton, British Columbia, Canada. The community is on Gitsegukla Indian Reserve No. 1.

History
The original village was located below the present day graveyard near the Skeena River. The village was destroyed in 1872 when a party of miners on their way to Omineca failed to extinguish their camp fire. The result was a significant confrontation that was only resolved when the Lieutant-Governor travelled on war-ship, HMS Scout, to meet the Gitsegukla chiefs at Metlakatla. They received compensation for their losses. Subsequently the community relocated slightly upriver. Following the building of a church, the village divided along religious lines. Methodists moved to the upriver community of Carnaby, and followers of the Salvation Army to Andimaul, although most later returned to Gitsegukla in the decades that followed.

Gitsegukla has been impacted by flooding of the Skeena River. In 1914, a large flood washed away many of the houses of the second village. And in 1936, another flood washed away the entire second village, and many totem poles, leading to the building of the current site higher above the riverbank.
In the Gitxsan language, Gitsegukla roughly translates to "people living under the precipice" or more specifically under the "Segukla" or "sharp-pointed" mountain.

References

External links
 Gitsegukla Homepage

Unincorporated settlements in British Columbia
Gitxsan
Skeena Country